Ntahangwa is a commune of Bujumbura Mairie Province in Burundi.

See also 
 Communes of Burundi

References 

Communes of Burundi
Bujumbura Province